This is a list of properties and historic districts in Milton, Massachusetts, that are listed on the National Register of Historic Places.

The locations of National Register properties and districts (at least for all showing latitude and longitude coordinates below) may be seen in an online map by clicking on "Map of all coordinates".

Current listings

|}

See also
National Register of Historic Places listings in Norfolk County, Massachusetts
List of National Historic Landmarks in Massachusetts

References

Milton, Massachusetts
Milton

Milton, Massachusetts